Dabbe: The Possession (stylized as D@bbe Cin Çarpması) is a 2013 Turkish horror film directed and written by Hasan Karacadağ. It is the fourth film in the D@bbe series.

Plot
Kübra was possessed by a djinn prior to her wedding when she stabbed her husband-to-be and killed him in front of the entire family. Ebru is a psychiatrist, Kübra's childhood friend from Kıbledere village. Ebru wants to observe Kübra and film the actions of so-called djinn exorcists in an attempt to prove whether djinns exist or not. Ebru and a djinn exorcist, Faruk, head to Kübra's village. They visit a cursed tree at the village entrance, hear stories about creepy events from Kıbledere's past and see a strange code, 7175, engraved in the tree.

Even with proof, Ebru isn't convinced about the curse, not even after Faruk performs exorcism on Kübra in her bedroom, then performs it alone in a room with two mirrors which are supernaturally smashed and give them a sign towards a toilet outside the house, which makes Faruk suspect that black magic tools are hidden under the toilet, which he finds. Faruk tells about Dabbe to Ebru, claiming he doesn't know what it means, but it is an apocalypse mentioned in the Quran which will cover the whole world like a web. Faruk thinks it refers to the internet; the World Wide Web. With just one click, the most dangerous spells of black magic can be found and thus, internet is the main issue here.

The story continues with Faruk performing exorcism in an even bigger warehouse and warns the djinn, Sare, inside Kübra to leave otherwise he will kill it. The exorcism ends in success with the djinn violently killed by Faruk. 
Everyone assumes that Kübra is healed, however with a strange turn of events, she tries to kill her aunt that same night and runs out to the cursed tree. Sick of Faruk's supposed exploitations, Ebru leaves him at the tree and takes Kübra to a hospital for medical and psychological assistance.
The next morning, Kübra's injured aunt reveals to Faruk that Kübra's father died on the night of her birth, assumingly while being possessed by Sare. Faruk, still not satisfied about his discoveries, rings his friend outside town and asks him about the 7175 code. Meanwhile, Ebru returns and they both agree to visit İlyas, a man who resides in an abandoned village and supposedly knows about Sare.

The two hunt the village for İlyas’ house all to no avail, when suddenly Faruk finds it at the very edge of the village. They are welcomed by İlyas, who explains that this all is due to a curse placed on the village by Kübra and Ebru's father. Ebru is shocked on the revelation and tries to defend her deceased father when İlyas elaborates that the two were poor, but greedy men who sought the help of djinns for finding treasures. On finding it, they killed the djinn and buried it but it came back and haunted Kübra. Ebru seemed to have been left alone because her family shifted to İzmir. Faruk and Ebru ask how İlyas knows all this on which he reveals his wife told him about this. They ask about where she is, and he tells she is right here, watching all of them. Revealing that his wife isn't human, but a djinn, with whom İlyas even has a child. Frightened, İlyas yells on them both to leave, saying the djinns of Sare's clan will try to harm him and his wife. He tells Faruk that the only way to lift the curse is to dig up Sare's dead body from under the cursed tree and bury it somewhere else in peace.

Faruk and Ebru drive back and do as İlyas had instructed and Faruk, after burying the vase with the supposed dead body of Sare, tells Ebru that her clan has decided to leave the village in peace. They return with the good news to Kübra's family and everyone is delighted. Kübra seems to have become healthy and normal and an obviously confused Ebru records all of her findings from the past days on camera, saying she still doesn't know whether to believe in all this or not.

That night, Kübra's mother suddenly tells Faruk that İlyas called him for a very urgent matter. Ebru follows but is stopped by Kübra's mother, pleading for her to stay with Kübra. Ebru agrees but asks Faruk to take her camera and record his conversation with İlyas. Ebru returns to her room and discovers a strange spell tucked inside her bra, while Faruk is stopped on his way by a call from his friend outside town. Faruk pulls over and the friend explains that 7175 is an ancient code originating from the Muslim tradition that believes Jesus wasn't killed but instead, saved by Allah and lives on to this day. The numbers 7175, in Arabic numerals are written as ۷۱۷۰ which, if read in Latin, spell “VIVO”. The word means “I am alive” and is used by djinns to signal they aren't dead. Upon the shocking revelation, Faruk realises Sare wasn't killed by Kübra and Ebru's father, but buried alive, which means he repeated the same deed as the last time.

His thoughts are interrupted by a frightened, injured İlyas banging on his car's window. Faruk hurries out and İlyas yells at him why he did that to Sare, for his wife has been captured by Sare's clan in revenge. Ebru, on the other hand enters Kübra's room as she sees Kübra in black clothes and a completely disfigured face, possessed completely by Sare. She screams and tries to escape but is suddenly trapped and beaten by Kübra's mother and sister. Injured and unable to understand the situation, Ebru faints.

İlyas on the other side reveals to Faruk that it was all a trap set to lure Ebru back to this village. There is absolutely no way to get rid of Sare, however she could be passed from one body to another. Hence, Kübra's family planned to save her daughter and make Ebru suffer for her father's deeds. As İlyas also, is captured by the djinns of Sare's clan, Faruk rushes back only to find the house empty and Kübra's aunt killed by her mother and sister. Panicking, he drives to the cursed tree, yelling Ebru's name when he is suddenly hit by someone and thrown into a well. He looks up to see the cunning faces of Kübra's mother and sister who throw heavy rocks on him. Unable to take the injuries, Faruk passes out. Ebru wakes up in a grave, seeing Kübra's mother and sister who tell her that they have suffered long enough and now it's Ebru's turn to have her soul devoured by Sare. An injured Ebru tries to plead and get up but is unable to do so. She is buried alive alongside several live snakes and after desperate cries for help, she starts to choke when suddenly the screen cuts to black, leaving her fate uncertain.

It is revealed in the credits that the film is based on a true story. Faruk was rescued by the villagers next morning, but the injuries to his head caused him amnesia. People tried to find Ebru and rescue her as well but she was never found. Kübra's family estate had been sold before Ebru and Faruk had arrived, hence after burying Ebru, the whole family escaped the village that night. They haven't been found to this day.

References

External links
 

2013 horror films
Genies in film
Exorcism in Islam
Films about curses
Films about trees
Films set in Turkey
Turkish horror films
2013 films